Heathrow Terminal 4 is a London Underground station at Heathrow Airport on the Heathrow branch of the Piccadilly line. The station is situated in Travelcard Zone 6.

History
The station opened on 12 April 1986 to serve the then recently opened Heathrow Terminal 4. It is situated on a unidirectional loop tunnel which was constructed between the existing Hatton Cross and Heathrow Terminals 2 & 3 stations. The station is one of four on the London Underground with only one platform, and is the only one with one-way train service. It is adjacent to Heathrow Terminal 4 railway station used by Elizabeth line services that travel through the newer mainline tunnel.

In-service routing took trains from Hatton Cross to Terminal 4 then Terminals 2 & 3 and back to Hatton Cross. On 7 January 2005, both the loop track and the station were closed temporarily in order to allow the construction of a new rail junction to link to the new Heathrow Terminal 5 station. All trains reverted to using the original westbound track from Hatton Cross direct to Heathrow Terminals 2 & 3 which was used prior to the opening of Heathrow Terminal 4. For passengers travelling to or from Heathrow Terminal 4, a shuttle bus was provided from Hatton Cross tube station. This situation continued until 17 September 2006 when the loop line and station were reopened after construction finished, with new security and customer announcement technologies in place at the station.

Current routing

Heathrow Terminal 4 tube station is located on a unidirectional clockwise loop that branches off after Hatton Cross westbound, and rejoins the Heathrow branch eastbound to the west of Heathrow Terminals 2 & 3.

Since the opening of Heathrow Terminal 5 station, alternate Heathrow branch trains run via the Terminal 4 loop, with the other alternate trains run directly to Heathrow Terminals 2 & 3, and Heathrow Terminal 5.

Until 2012, free transfer was not possible between terminals, in contrast to the Heathrow Express. In January 2012, free travel was introduced for Oyster card holders between the three Heathrow stations. But to travel from Heathrow Terminals 2 & 3 or Terminal 5 to Terminal 4 one must change trains at Hatton Cross. This journey is free, despite Hatton Cross itself not being part of the free travel zone.

On 9 May 2020, Heathrow Terminal 4 station closed temporarily until 14 June 2022, due to the closure of the airport's Terminal 4 during the COVID-19 pandemic in London.

On 14 June 2022, this station reopened for passenger service.

Connections
Two London Buses routes serve the station: 482 and 490.

Gallery

See also
Heathrow Terminal 4 railway station

References

External links
  Platform of Terminal 4 station.

Piccadilly line stations
Tube stations in the London Borough of Hillingdon
Airport railway stations in the United Kingdom
Single platform tube stations
4
Railway stations in Great Britain opened in 1986
1986 establishments in England